Saby is both a given name and a surname. Notable people with the name include:

 Bruno Saby (born 1949), French rally driver
 Kasper Såby (born 1974), Danish football player
 Saby Kamalich (1939–2017), Peruvian-Mexican actress
 Saby Natonga (1970), Vanuatuan football manager

See also
 Sæby, Denmark, a town